Bindiya Goswami is an Indian former actress, who is best known for her works in Hindi cinema throughout the 1970s and 1980s.

Film career
Bindiya was discovered at a party, when she was a teenager, by Hema Malini's mother. She felt that Bindiya had a resemblance to Hema and recommended her to film producers. Bindiya's first Hindi film was Jeevan Jyoti opposite Vijay Arora. Though the film flopped, Bindiya forged ahead and met success with director Basu Chatterjee's Khatta Meetha (1977) and Prem Vivah (1979). Her biggest hit was  Hrishikesh Mukherjee's comedy film Gol Maal (1979). The success of Dada (1979) led her to sign a number of films with Vinod Mehra. She also bagged a role opposite Shashi Kapoor in the big-budget film Shaan (1980).

Career as costume designer
Bindiya has taken up designing costumes for female stars such as Rani Mukherjee, Kareena Kapoor and Aishwarya Rai for her husband J.P. Dutta's films, such as Border (1997), Refugee (2000), LOC Kargil (2003) and Umrao Jaan (2007).

Personal life
Bindiya was born in Kaman, Bharatpur (Rajasthan) to Shri Venugopal Goswami, a Tamil Iyengar father, and Dolly, a Catholic mother.  Her father was a priest of Vallabh Sampraday and married 7 times in his lifetime. Bindiya was initially married to her frequent co-star Vinod Mehra, but they divorced after four years of marriage. Thereafter, Bindiya gave up her acting career to marry director J.P. Dutta in 1985, with whom she has two daughters, Nidhi and Siddhi.  Her daughter Nidhi is following in her mother's footsteps by becoming an actress.

Filmography

Mera Yaar Mera Dushman (1987)
Vishaal (1987) – Chanvi
Avinash (1986)
Chor Police (1983) – Rohan's wife (Guest Appearance)
Mehandi (1983) – Gauri
Lalach (1983)
Rang Birangi (1983) – Herself
   Reshma (1982) punjabi movie 
Aamne Samne (1982) – Inspector Jyoti
Hamari Bahu Alka (1982) – Alka
Heeron Ka Chor (1982)
Khud-Daar (1982) – Manju
Hotel (1981) – Vandana (as Bindiya)
Yeh Rishta Na Tootay (1981) – Kiran Kapoor
Sannata (1981)
Sansani: The Sensation (1981) – Nisha Srivastav
Bandish (1980) – Shanti
Khoon Kharaba (1980)
Shaan (1980) – Renu
Takkar (1980) – Meena
Ahsaas (1979) – Herself
Dada (1979) – Kamini
Golmaal (1979) – Urmila
Jaandaar (1979)
Jaani Dushman (1979) – Shanti (Thakur's daughter)
Khandaan (1979)
Muqabla (1979) – Vicky's girlfriend/wife
Prem Vivah (1979)
Ankh Ka Tara (1978) – Geeta Gupta
College Girl (1978)
Khatta Meetha (1978) – Zarine
Ram Kasam (1978)
Chala Murari Hero Banane (1977)
Chhota Baap (1977)
Duniyadari (1977)
Jay Vejay (1977) – Princess Padmavati
Khel Kismat Ka (1977)
Mukti (1977) – Pinky
Karm (1977) - child artist
Jeevan Jyoti (1976)
Chik Mik Bijuli (1969) (Assamese)

References

External links

 

Living people
Indian film actresses
Actresses in Hindi cinema
Actresses from Rajasthan
Place of birth missing (living people)
Indian costume designers
20th-century Indian actresses
20th-century Indian designers
Actresses in Assamese cinema
People from Bharatpur district
Year of birth missing (living people)